The 2001 NCAA Men's Water Polo Championship was the 33rd annual NCAA Men's Water Polo Championship to determine the national champion of NCAA men's collegiate water polo. Tournament matches were played at Avery Aquatic Center in Stanford, California during December 2001.

Stanford defeated UCLA in the final, 8–5, to win their ninth national title. The Cardinal (22–1) were coached by Dante Dettamanti.

The Most Outstanding Player of the tournament was Tony Azevedo from Stanford. Azevedo, along with six other players, comprised the All-Tournament Team. 

Kevin Witt, from Loyola Marymount, was the tournament's leading scorer, with 6 goals.

Qualification
Since there has only ever been one single national championship for water polo, all NCAA men's water polo programs (whether from Division I, Division II, or Division III) were eligible. A total of 4 teams were invited to contest this championship.

Bracket
Site: Avery Aquatic Center, Stanford, California

All-tournament team 
Tony Azevedo, Stanford (Most outstanding player)
Nick Ellis, Stanford
Matt Flesher, UCLA
Peter Hudnut, Stanford
Jeff Nesmith, Stanford
Brett Ormsby, UCLA
Kevin Witt, Loyola Marymount

See also 
 NCAA Men's Water Polo Championship
 NCAA Women's Water Polo Championship

References

NCAA Men's Water Polo Championship
NCAA Men's Water Polo Championship
2001 in sports in California
December 2001 sports events in the United States
2001